Dr. Mohamed Zahir Hussain,(Dhivehi:ޑރ. މުޙައްމަދު ޒާހިރު ޙުސައިން) is the Chancellor of Maldives National University and the former Minister of Education as well as the Minister of Youth and Sports of the Maldives. He resigned from the post of Youth Minister in the year 2004 but was again appointed as a senior minister (a special advisor to the president) in 2006 and served in the cabinet of President Maumoon Abdul Gayoom until 2008 presidential election. In 2008, he was conferred the distinguished "Order of Izzuddin" by President Maumoon Abdul Gayoom. He is also the Chairman/Owner of the newspaper Haveeru Daily which was established in 1978. Zahirhas three children – Leena Zahir Hussein, Vail Zahir Hussein and Lubna Zahir Hussein.

References

Maldivian businesspeople
Living people
Government ministers of the Maldives
Year of birth missing (living people)